Medvezhye is a rural locality (a village) in Sizemskoye Rural Settlement, Sheksninsky District, Vologda Oblast, Russia. The population was 33 as of 2002.

Geography 
Medvezhye is located 20 km northeast of Sheksna (the district's administrative centre) by road. Polezhayevo is the nearest rural locality.

References 

Rural localities in Sheksninsky District